Pseudhammus discoideus is a species of beetle in the family Cerambycidae. It was described by Harold in 1879.

References

discoideus
Beetles described in 1879